{{Infobox pageant titleholder
| name         = Gloria Diaz
| image        = Gloria Diaz Miss Universe 2016.jpg
| caption      = Diaz in 2017
| birth_name   = Gloria Maria Aspillera Diaz
| birth_date   = 
| birth_place  = Manila, Philippines 
| years_active = 1969–present
| height       = 5 ft 5 in
| eye_color    = Brown
| hair_color   = Dark brown
| occupation   = Actress, beauty queen
| title        =
Binibining Pilipinas Universe 1969Miss Universe 1969| competitions =
Binibining Pilipinas 1969(Winner – Binibining Pilipinas Universe 1969)Miss Universe 1969(Winner)(10 Best in Swimsuit)
|children      = 3,  including Isabelle Daza
| domestic_partner = Michael Osmeña de Jesus
| spouse       = 
}}Gloria Maria Aspillera Diaz' (born April 5, 1951) is a Filipino actress of film and television, model and beauty queen who rose to fame after being crowned Miss Universe 1969, becoming the first Filipino to hold the Miss Universe title on its 18th edition.

Early life and family
Often cited as being part of the Díaz clan, she is one of twelve children (ten girls and two boys). Her sister, Rio Díaz, was also an actress and beauty titlist.

Pageantry

While studying in college, Díaz was scouted by a pageant aficionado and was convinced to join the sixth edition of Binibining Pilipinas. Her looks and, more importantly, her wit captivated the audience and she was crowned 1969 Binibining Pilipinas at 18 years old.

Díaz was then sent to Miami Beach, Florida, U.S. to compete in Miss Universe 1969. Arriving at the pageant as an early favorite, Díaz did not disappoint and sailed throughout all the pageant's events that led up to the finals at the Miami Beach Auditorium. Making it to the Top 5, she participated in the final question round and her answer to the question regarding "men in the moon" charmed the audience and the judges. She was crowned as Miss Universe on July 19, 1969, and became the very first Filipina to win the Miss Universe crown. News of her victory (and her measurements) were communicated to the Apollo 11 crew members during their space mission.

During her reign, Díaz travelled through several countries to promote the advocacies supported by the Miss Universe Organization as well as appeared in many public and television events in the United States.

Acting career
Beginnings
Shortly after her reign as Miss Universe ended, she pursued an acting career in the Philippines, and in 1975, she was cast in her breakthrough performance as Isabel in the critically acclaimed Ang Pinakamagandang Hayop sa Balat ng Lupa. Her performance in the film was met with praise by film critics and was considered one of the most promising breakthroughs of any actress in Philippine cinema. Later that year, she was nominated for a FAMAS Award for Best Performance by an Actress in a Lead Role.

Díaz continued acting in film for many years before trying out starring in television. It was in 1996 when she first appeared in the drama series Anna Karenina. She garnered popularity after appearing in the sitcom Kool Ka Lang on GMA Network in 1998. That same year, she appeared in the biopic film Jose Rizal where she played Rizal's mother Dona Teodora Alonso. Her portrayal of Rizal's mother won a Best Supporting Actress award at the 1998 Metro Manila Film Festival.

In 2006, Díaz was cast in the psychological thriller Nasaan Ka Man alongside award-winning actress Hilda Koronel, Claudine Barretto, Diether Ocampo and Jericho Rosales. For her role as Lilia, a woman trying to suppress her distraught as she tries to keep her family together, Díaz was once again nominated and eventually awarded as FAMAS Best Supporting Actress.

In 2009, she once again won a FAMAS Award for Best Supporting Actress for her role in the highly acclaimed film Sagrada Familia.

In 2010, she starred in two GMA projects, Beauty Queen and Diva. She returned to GMA for Mistaken Identity after a brief stint in 100 Days to Heaven.
 
In 2011, she played a supporting stint in her first TV5 project, Glamorosa, as Dra. Claudia Montesilva-Herrera.

Recent works
From 2012 to 2018, Díaz has appeared in several ABS-CBN television dramas including Kung Ako'y Iiwan Mo, May Isang Pangarap, Mirabella, Dream Dad and roles in MMK and an appearance in Ipaglaban Mo. She returned to GMA again in 2018 to play an evil mother role on Pamilya Roces. She also participated in the blockbuster comedy films Sisterakas and Kung Fu Divas.

In 2019, Díaz returned to ABS-CBN and was recently cast in the afternoon drama series Los Bastardos where she portrayed the role of Soledad Cardinal, the long-lost wife of Don Roman Cardinal (Ronaldo Valdez), and Consuelo Cuevas, the mother of Lorenzo Cuevas (Joseph Marco). She also appeared as a fictional version of herself in the second season of the Netflix series Insatiable with Dallas Roberts and Debby Ryan.

In 2020, Díaz returned to TV5 to play the role of Belinda "Tyang Bella" Vasquez on Oh My Dad!.

Personal life
Díaz obtained her high school diploma from Saint Scholastica’s College of Manila.

She was married in 1986 in Manila with honeymoon in Diamond Head, Hawaii and later separated from businessman Gabriel Daza III in 1995, with whom she has two daughters, Isabelle and Ava, and one son, Raphael. After her separation with Daza, she has since been in a relationship with Michael Osmeña de Jesus, a Filipino banker.    

In 2010, the Cebu chapter of the Vice Mayors League declared Gloria Diaz persona non grata.

Filmography
Film

Television

Nominations and awards

Controversy
In a TV Patrol interview shortly after the Miss Universe 2010 pageant on August 23, Díaz commented on Binibining Pilipinas contestant Venus Raj becoming 4th runner-up. She suggested in the interview that perhaps Raj and other Filipinas would benefit from answering pageant questions via the use of an interpreter rather than in English. Díaz further said that: 

Her remark sparked outrage amongst many Cebuanos, who felt that Díaz insulted their English proficiency by championing the controversial issue of Tagalog imperialist culture in the Philippines. Cebuano politicians such as Cebu Governor Gwendolyn Garcia and Congresswoman Rachel del Mar called on her to apologise. In response to the controversy, Díaz declared there was no need to apologize and instead clarified her remarks:

On 1 September 2010, the Vice Mayors' League of the Philippines-Cebu passed a resolution declaring Díaz a persona non grata'' within Cebu City.

See also

 Margie Moran
 Pia Wurtzbach
 Catriona Gray
 Binibining Pilipinas
 Philippines at Major Beauty Pageants

References

External links

   

1951 births
20th-century Filipino actresses
21st-century Filipino actresses
ABS-CBN personalities
Binibining Pilipinas winners
Filipino film actresses
Filipino television actresses
Filipino television personalities
Filipino women comedians
GMA Network personalities
Ilocano people
Living people
Filipino people of German descent
Filipino people of Spanish descent
Miss Universe 1969 contestants
Miss Universe winners
People from Manila
People from La Union
St. Scholastica's College Manila alumni
Star Circle Quest
TV5 (Philippine TV network) personalities